Bernardo Fernandez (March 5, 1918 – November 29, 2014) was a baseball pitcher who played in the Negro leagues. He played for the  Atlanta Black Crackers, Jacksonville Red Caps, Philadelphia Stars, Brooklyn Royal Giants, Pittsburgh Crawfords and New York Black Yankees, among other independent and minor Negro league teams.

He was born in Tampa, Florida, and died at 96 in North Las Vegas, Nevada where he lived.

References

External links
 and Seamheads

1918 births
2014 deaths
Atlanta Black Crackers players
Brooklyn Royal Giants players
Jacksonville Red Caps players
New York Black Yankees players
Philadelphia Stars players
Pittsburgh Crawfords players
Baseball players from Tampa, Florida
People from North Las Vegas, Nevada
20th-century African-American sportspeople
21st-century African-American people